Naturally occurring dysprosium (66Dy) is composed of 7 stable isotopes, 156Dy, 158Dy, 160Dy, 161Dy, 162Dy, 163Dy and 164Dy, with 164Dy being the most abundant (28.18% natural abundance). Twenty-nine radioisotopes have been characterized, with the most stable being 154Dy with a half-life of 3.0 million years, 159Dy with a half-life of 144.4 days, and 166Dy with a half-life of 81.6 hours. All of the remaining radioactive isotopes have half-lives that are less than 10 hours, and the majority of these have half-lives that are less than 30 seconds. This element also has 12 meta states, with the most stable being 165mDy (half-life 1.257 minutes), 147mDy (half-life 55.7 seconds) and 145mDy (half-life 13.6 seconds).

The primary decay mode before the most abundant stable isotope, 164Dy, is electron capture, and the primary mode after is beta decay. The primary decay products before 164Dy are terbium isotopes, and the primary products after are holmium isotopes. Dysprosium is the heaviest element to have isotopes that are predicted to be stable rather than observationally stable isotopes that are predicted to be radioactive.

List of isotopes 

|-
| 138Dy
| style="text-align:right" | 66
| style="text-align:right" | 72
| 137.96249(64)#
| 200# ms
|
|
| 0+
|
|
|-
| 139Dy
| style="text-align:right" | 66
| style="text-align:right" | 73
| 138.95954(54)#
| 600(200) ms
|
|
| 7/2+#
|
|
|-
| 140Dy
| style="text-align:right" | 66
| style="text-align:right" | 74
| 139.95401(54)#
| 700# ms
| β+
| 140Tb
| 0+
|
|
|-
| style="text-indent:1em" | 140mDy
| colspan="3" style="text-indent:2em" | 2166.1(5) keV
| 7.0(5) μs
|
|
| (8−)
|
|
|-
| rowspan=2|141Dy
| rowspan=2 style="text-align:right" | 66
| rowspan=2 style="text-align:right" | 75
| rowspan=2|140.95135(32)#
| rowspan=2|0.9(2) s
| β+
| 141Tb
| rowspan=2|(9/2−)
| rowspan=2|
| rowspan=2|
|-
| β+, p (rare)
| 140Gd
|-
| rowspan=2|142Dy
| rowspan=2 style="text-align:right" | 66
| rowspan=2 style="text-align:right" | 76
| rowspan=2|141.94637(39)#
| rowspan=2|2.3(3) s
| β+ (99.94%)
| 142Tb
| rowspan=2|0+
| rowspan=2|
| rowspan=2|
|-
| β+, p (.06%)
| 141Gd
|-
| rowspan=2|143Dy
| rowspan=2 style="text-align:right" | 66
| rowspan=2 style="text-align:right" | 77
| rowspan=2|142.94383(21)#
| rowspan=2|5.6(10) s
| β+
| 143Tb
| rowspan=2|(1/2+)
| rowspan=2|
| rowspan=2|
|-
| β+, p (rare)
| 142Gd
|-
| style="text-indent:1em" | 143mDy
| colspan="3" style="text-indent:2em" | 310.7(6) keV
| 3.0(3) s
|
|
| (11/2−)
|
|
|-
| rowspan=2|144Dy
| rowspan=2 style="text-align:right" | 66
| rowspan=2 style="text-align:right" | 78
| rowspan=2|143.93925(3)
| rowspan=2|9.1(4) s
| β+
| 144Tb
| rowspan=2|0+
| rowspan=2|
| rowspan=2|
|-
| β+, p (rare)
| 143Gd
|-
| rowspan=2|145Dy
| rowspan=2 style="text-align:right" | 66
| rowspan=2 style="text-align:right" | 79
| rowspan=2|144.93743(5)
| rowspan=2|9.5(10) s
| β+
| 145Tb
| rowspan=2|(1/2+)
| rowspan=2|
| rowspan=2|
|-
| β+, p (rare)
| 144Gd
|-
| style="text-indent:1em" | 145mDy
| colspan="3" style="text-indent:2em" | 118.2(2) keV
| 14.1(7) s
| β+
| 145Tb
| (11/2−)
|
|
|-
| 146Dy
| style="text-align:right" | 66
| style="text-align:right" | 80
| 145.932845(29)
| 33.2(7) s
| β+
| 146Tb
| 0+
|
|
|-
| style="text-indent:1em" | 146mDy
| colspan="3" style="text-indent:2em" | 2935.7(6) keV
| 150(20) ms
| IT
| 146Dy
| (10+)#
|
|
|-
| rowspan=2|147Dy
| rowspan=2 style="text-align:right" | 66
| rowspan=2 style="text-align:right" | 81
| rowspan=2|146.931092(21)
| rowspan=2|40(10) s
| β+ (99.95%)
| 147Tb
| rowspan=2|1/2+
| rowspan=2|
| rowspan=2|
|-
| β+, p (.05%)
| 146Tb
|-
| rowspan=2 style="text-indent:1em" | 147m1Dy
| rowspan=2 colspan="3" style="text-indent:2em" | 750.5(4) keV
| rowspan=2|55(1) s
| β+ (65%)
| 147Tb
| rowspan=2|11/2−
| rowspan=2|
| rowspan=2|
|-
| IT (35%)
| 147Dy
|-
| style="text-indent:1em" | 147m2Dy
| colspan="3" style="text-indent:2em" | 3407.2(8) keV
| 0.40(1) μs
|
|
| (27/2−)
|
|
|-
| 148Dy
| style="text-align:right" | 66
| style="text-align:right" | 82
| 147.927150(11)
| 3.3(2) min
| β+
| 148Tb
| 0+
|
|
|-
| 149Dy
| style="text-align:right" | 66
| style="text-align:right" | 83
| 148.927305(9)
| 4.20(14) min
| β+
| 149Tb
| 7/2(−)
|
|
|-
| rowspan=2 style="text-indent:1em" | 149mDy
| rowspan=2 colspan="3" style="text-indent:2em" | 2661.1(4) keV
| rowspan=2|490(15) ms
| IT (99.3%)
| 149Dy
| rowspan=2|(27/2−)
| rowspan=2|
| rowspan=2|
|-
| β+ (.7%)
| 149Tb
|-
| rowspan=2|150Dy
| rowspan=2 style="text-align:right" | 66
| rowspan=2 style="text-align:right" | 84
| rowspan=2|149.925585(5)
| rowspan=2|7.17(5) min
| β+ (64%)
| 150Tb
| rowspan=2|0+
| rowspan=2|
| rowspan=2|
|-
| α (36%)
| 146Gd
|-
| rowspan=2|151Dy
| rowspan=2 style="text-align:right" | 66
| rowspan=2 style="text-align:right" | 85
| rowspan=2|150.926185(4)
| rowspan=2|17.9(3) min
| β+ (94.4%)
| 151Tb
| rowspan=2|7/2(−)
| rowspan=2|
| rowspan=2|
|-
| α (5.6%)
| 147Gd
|-
| rowspan=2|152Dy
| rowspan=2 style="text-align:right" | 66
| rowspan=2 style="text-align:right" | 86
| rowspan=2|151.924718(6)
| rowspan=2|2.38(2) h
| EC (99.9%)
| 152Tb
| rowspan=2|0+
| rowspan=2|
| rowspan=2|
|-
| α (.1%)
| 148Gd
|-
| rowspan=2|153Dy
| rowspan=2 style="text-align:right" | 66
| rowspan=2 style="text-align:right" | 87
| rowspan=2|152.925765(5)
| rowspan=2|6.4(1) h
| β+ (99.99%)
| 153Tb
| rowspan=2|7/2(−)
| rowspan=2|
| rowspan=2|
|-
| α (.00939%)
| 149Gd
|-
| rowspan=2|154Dy
| rowspan=2 style="text-align:right" | 66
| rowspan=2 style="text-align:right" | 88
| rowspan=2|153.924424(8)
| rowspan=2|3.0(15)×106 y
| α
| 150Gd
| rowspan=2|0+
| rowspan=2|
| rowspan=2|
|-
| β+β+ (rare)
| 154Gd
|-
| 155Dy
| style="text-align:right" | 66
| style="text-align:right" | 89
| 154.925754(13)
| 9.9(2) h
| β+
| 155Tb
| 3/2−
|
|
|-
| style="text-indent:1em" | 155mDy
| colspan="3" style="text-indent:2em" | 234.33(3) keV
| 6(1) μs
|
|
| 11/2−
|
|
|-
| 156Dy
| style="text-align:right" | 66
| style="text-align:right" | 90
| 155.924283(7)
| colspan=3 align=center|Observationally Stable
| 0+
| 5.6(3)×10−4
|
|-
| 157Dy
| style="text-align:right" | 66
| style="text-align:right" | 91
| 156.925466(7)
| 8.14(4) h
| β+
| 157Tb
| 3/2−
|
|
|-
| style="text-indent:1em" | 157m1Dy
| colspan="3" style="text-indent:2em" | 161.99(3) keV
| 1.3(2) μs
|
|
| 9/2+
|
|
|-
| style="text-indent:1em" | 157m2Dy
| colspan="3" style="text-indent:2em" | 199.38(7) keV
| 21.6(16) ms
| IT
| 157Dy
| 11/2−
|
|
|-
| 158Dy
| style="text-align:right" | 66
| style="text-align:right" | 92
| 157.924409(4)
| colspan=3 align=center|Observationally Stable
| 0+
| 9.5(3)×10−4
|
|-
| 159Dy
| style="text-align:right" | 66
| style="text-align:right" | 93
| 158.9257392(29)
| 144.4(2) d
| EC
| 159Tb
| 3/2−
|
|
|-
| style="text-indent:1em" | 159mDy
| colspan="3" style="text-indent:2em" | 352.77(14) keV
| 122(3) μs
|
|
| 11/2−
|
|
|-
| 160Dy
| style="text-align:right" | 66
| style="text-align:right" | 94
| 159.9251975(27)
| colspan=3 align=center|Observationally Stable
| 0+
| 0.02329(18)
|
|-
| 161Dy
| style="text-align:right" | 66
| style="text-align:right" | 95
| 160.9269334(27)
| colspan=3 align=center|Observationally Stable
| 5/2+
| 0.18889(42)
|
|-
| 162Dy
| style="text-align:right" | 66
| style="text-align:right" | 96
| 161.9267984(27)
| colspan=3 align=center|Observationally Stable
| 0+
| 0.25475(36)
|
|-
| 163Dy
| style="text-align:right" | 66
| style="text-align:right" | 97
| 162.9287312(27)
| colspan=3 align=center|Stable
| 5/2−
| 0.24896(42)
|
|-
| 164Dy
| style="text-align:right" | 66
| style="text-align:right" | 98
| 163.9291748(27)
| colspan=3 align=center|Stable
| 0+
| 0.28260(54)
|
|-
| 165Dy
| style="text-align:right" | 66
| style="text-align:right" | 99
| 164.9317033(27)
| 2.334(1) h
| β−
| 165Ho
| 7/2+
|
|
|-
| rowspan=2 style="text-indent:1em" | 165mDy
| rowspan=2 colspan="3" style="text-indent:2em" | 108.160(3) keV
| rowspan=2|1.257(6) min
| IT (97.76%)
| 165Dy
| rowspan=2|1/2−
| rowspan=2|
| rowspan=2|
|-
| β− (2.24%)
| 165Ho
|-
| 166Dy
| style="text-align:right" | 66
| style="text-align:right" | 100
| 165.9328067(28)
| 81.6(1) h
| β−
| 166Ho
| 0+
|
|
|-
| 167Dy
| style="text-align:right" | 66
| style="text-align:right" | 101
| 166.93566(6)
| 6.20(8) min
| β−
| 167Ho
| (1/2−)
|
|
|-
| 168Dy
| style="text-align:right" | 66
| style="text-align:right" | 102
| 167.93713(15)
| 8.7(3) min
| β−
| 168Ho
| 0+
|
|
|-
| 169Dy
| style="text-align:right" | 66
| style="text-align:right" | 103
| 168.94031(32)
| 39(8) s
| β−
| 169Ho
| (5/2−)
|
|
|-
| 170Dy
| style="text-align:right" | 66
| style="text-align:right" | 104
| 169.94239(21)#
| 30# s
| β−
| 170Ho
| 0+
|
|
|-
| 171Dy
| style="text-align:right" | 66
| style="text-align:right" | 105
| 170.94620(32)#
| 6# s
| β−
| 171Ho
| 7/2−#
|
|
|-
| 172Dy
| style="text-align:right" | 66
| style="text-align:right" | 106
| 171.94876(43)#
| 3# s
| β−
| 172Ho
| 0+
|
|
|-
| 173Dy
| style="text-align:right" | 66
| style="text-align:right" | 107
| 172.95300(54)#
| 2# s
| β−
| 173Ho
| 9/2+#
|
|

 Geologically exceptional samples are found associated with the Oklo natural nuclear fission reactor, in which the isotopic composition lies outside the reported range. The uncertainty in the atomic mass may exceed the stated value for such specimens.

Dysprosium-165

The radioactive isotope 165Dy, with a half life of 2.334 hours, has radiopharmaceutical uses.

References 

 Isotope masses from:

 Isotopic compositions and standard atomic masses from:

 Half-life, spin, and isomer data selected from the following sources.

 
Dysprosium
Dysprosium